August von Hayek (14 December 1871 – 11 June 1928) was an Austrian physician and botanist born in Vienna. He was the son of naturalist Gustav von Hayek and the father of economist Friedrich Hayek (1899–1992).

In 1895 he obtained his medical doctorate from the University of Vienna. Soon, he was employed by the municipal ministry of health. He obtained his PhD in 1905. Beginning in 1922, he taught classes at the Hochschule für Bodenkultur in Vienna, and from 1926, he was an associate professor at the university. He died in 1928 in Vienna.

He is remembered for phytogeographical investigations that took place within the Austria-Hungarian Empire, in particular, Styria and the Balkans. He also conducted detailed studies on the historical development of flora found along the eastern and southeastern edge of the Alps. In the field of plant systematics, he specialized in Centaurea species native to Austria-Hungary.

He was married to Felicitas von Juraschek.

Principal works 
 Prodromus Florae Peninsulae Balkanicae, (Prodomus of Balkan peninsula flora).
 Flora der Steiermark, (Flora of Styria).
 Schedae ad Florum stiriacum exsiccatum, 1904–1912.
 Die Pflanzendecke Österreich-Ungarns, Volume 1, (Vegetation of Austria-Hungary), 1916.
 Allgemeine Pflanzengeographie, (General phytogeography), 1926.

References

External links
 

20th-century Austrian botanists
Academic staff of the University of Vienna
Scientists from Vienna
Austrian people of Moravian-German descent
1871 births
1928 deaths
20th-century Austrian physicians